Pachysticus is a genus of beetles in the family Cerambycidae, containing the following species:

 Pachysticus adlbaueri Vives, 2004
 Pachysticus crassipes Fairmaire, 1889
 Pachysticus jenisi Vives, 2004
 Pachysticus minutus Vives, 2004
 Pachysticus morosus (Fairmaire, 1894)
 Pachysticus nigrofasciatus Vives, 2004

References

Dorcasominae